Michel Xavier Goemans (born December, 1964) is a Belgian-American professor of applied mathematics and the RSA Professor of Mathematics at MIT working in discrete mathematics and combinatorial optimization at CSAIL and MIT Operations Research Center.

Career
Goemans earned his doctorate in 1990 from MIT. Goemans is the "Leighton Family Professor" of Applied Mathematics at MIT and an adjunct professor at the University of Waterloo. He was also a professor at the University of Louvain and a visiting professor at the RIMS of the University of Kyoto.

Recognition
In 1991 he received the A.W. Tucker Prize. From 1995 to 1997 he was a Sloan Fellow. In 1998 he was an Invited Speaker of the International Congress of Mathematicians in Berlin. For the academic year 2007–2008 he was a Guggenheim Fellow.

Goemans is a Fellow of the Association for Computing Machinery (2008), a fellow of the American Mathematical Society (2012), and a fellow of the Society for Industrial and Applied Mathematics (2013). In 2000 he was awarded the MOS-AMS Fulkerson Prize for joint work with David P. Williamson on the semidefinite programming approximation algorithm for the maximum cut problem. In 2012 Goemans was awarded the Farkas Prize. In 2022 he received the AMS Steele Prize for Seminal Contribution to Research.

Personal life
His hobby is sailing. Goemans has Belgian and US citizenship.

References

1964 births
Living people
Belgian mathematicians
Fellows of the American Mathematical Society
Massachusetts Institute of Technology School of Science faculty
Fellows of the Society for Industrial and Applied Mathematics
Theoretical computer scientists